Harud is a 2010 Indian Kashmiri-language film directed by Aamir Bashir in his feature-film directorial debut. It is an independent, art house drama. Harud premiered at the 2010 Toronto International Film Festival. The film stars Reza Naji and Shahnawaz Bhat and takes place in Srinagar. It tells the story of a family who lives in the conflict-ridden region of Kashmir.

Cast and characters
 Reza Naji as Yusuf
 Shahnawaz Bhat as Rafiq
 Shamim Basharat as Fatima
 Salma Ashai as Shaheen
 Mudessir Ahmed Khan as Ishaq
 Rayes Mohiuddin as Aslam

References

External links
 

2010 films
Kashmiri-language films